The Akaflieg Berlin B8 was a German sailplane built in the late 1930s for the 1939 Olympic games glider competition in Rome. It was a high-wing sailplane with a cantilever shoulder-wing, dive air-brakes and all wood construction.

Specifications (variant specified)

See also
List of gliders

References

1930s German sailplanes
Akaflieg Berlin aircraft
Aircraft first flown in 1939